Matveyevskaya is a rural locality (a village) in Chushevitskoye Rural Settlement, Verkhovazhsky District, Vologda Oblast, Russia. The population was 7 as of 2002.

Geography 
The distance to Verkhovazhye is 41.5 km, to Chushevitsy is 25 km. Velikodvorskaya, Terentyevskaya, Zhavoronkovo, Kochevarsky Pogost are the nearest rural localities.

References 

Rural localities in Verkhovazhsky District